Arquata may refer to:

 Arquata del Tronto, a municipality in the Province of Ascoli Piceno in the Marche region of Italy
 Arquata Scrivia, a municipality in the Province of Alessandria in the region Piedmont of Italy

See also 
 Arquà (disambiguation)
 Arquita, a genus of flowering plants